The Aiguilles de la Penaz (2,688 m) is a mountain in the Beaufortain Massif in Haute-Savoie, France.

References

Mountains of the Alps
Mountains of Haute-Savoie